Jendemsfjellet is a mountain in Hustadvika Municipality in Møre og Romsdal county, Norway. The cone-shaped mountain is located just northeast of the villages of Jendem and Hollingen (on the municipal border with Aukra Municipality), southeast of the small island of Vågøya, and southwest of the village of Aureosen. The  mountain sits just east of Julsundet strait and south of Frænafjorden.

References

Mountains of Møre og Romsdal
Hustadvika (municipality)